Ctenosia is a genus of moths in the subfamily Arctiinae. The genus was erected by George Hampson in 1900.

Species
 Ctenosia albiceps Hampson, 1901
 Ctenosia infuscata Lower, 1902
 Ctenosia inornata Wileman
 Ctenosia nephelistis Hampson, 1918
 Ctenosia psectriphora Distant, 1899

References

External links

Lithosiini